Friese-Greene  may refer to:
 Claude Friese-Greene (1898–1943), a British-born cinema technician and filmmaker, son of William
 Tim Friese-Greene (contemporary), an English musician and producer, grandson of Claude and great-grandson of William
 William Friese-Greene (1855–1921), a British portrait photographer and prolific inventor, in particular of early devices for moving pictures.

See also
 Friese
 Greene (surname)

Compound surnames
English-language surnames